Rojulu Marayi is a 1955 Indian Telugu-language drama film directed by Tapi Chanakya. It stars Akkineni Nageswara Rao, Sowcar Janaki with music composed by Master Venu. The film was produced by C. V. R. Prasad on Sarathi Films banner.

The story is set in a native village environment and portrays the changing times. The film is the debut of Waheeda Rehman in the film industry. Rojulu Marayi was released on 14 April 1955. The film ran for over 25 weeks in theatres, thereby becoming a silver jubilee film, and was remade in Tamil as Kaalam Maari Pochi (1956). Rojulu Marayi is considered as a milestone among social films in Telugu cinema.

Plot 
The film begins in a village where the Zamindar Sagarayya is malicious and tyrannizes the farmers by mingling with Karanam Sambayya and a goon Polayya. Kotayya, an honest peasant leads a happy family life with his wife, son Venu, and daughter Bharati. Kotayya is most loyal to Sagarayya but Venu always confronts his atrocities.

Meanwhile, Kotayya decides to couple up Bharati with Venu's close friend Gopalam when his father Venkatadri insists on dowry and is helpless Kotayya requests a loan from Sagarayya. Exploiting it, Sagarayya wants to mortgage his property which Venu refuses and a rift arises between father and son. Moreover, Venu loves Radha, the daughter of a retired army soldier Ratnam who is ostracized from the village. Knowing it, Sambayya aggravates Kotayya, as a result, Venu leaves the house and marries Radha.

Right now, Venu collaborates with all the peasants and decides to perform collective farming for which he sends a petition to the collectorate. Keeping the grudge in mind, Sagarayya suffers Venu a lot but he stands up with courage and moves forward. Thereafter, District Collector arrives for the inspection where Venu breaks out the offenses of Sagarayya and Sambayya and sanctions wastelands for cultivation. Nevertheless, Sagarayya creates many obstacles that Venu gamely encounters. Distressed, Sagarayya strikes and necks out Polayya for his inability when Venu embraces and reforms him.

At present, Sagarayya ploys to spoil Bharati's match when Radha resolves the conflict with her amicable. So, as a home straight, Sagarayya forces Kotayya to stop nuptials when he too revolts against him. During the time of marriage, Sagarayya intrigues and attacks the wedding procession and Venu rescues them. Just before, Sagarayya also blasts the reservoir when the crop is about to flood out. At last, the entire village unites together and safeguards it, ceases Sagarayya, and gets him arrested. The film ends with the marriage of Gopalam and Bharati and Kotayya inviting back Venu and Radha.

Cast 
Film cast is referenced from The Hindu article.
Akkineni Nageswara Rao as Venu
Sowcar Janaki as Radha
C. S. R as Sagarayya
Relangi as Polayya
Ramana Reddy as Karanam Sambayya
Perumallu as Kotayya
Seetaram as Ratnam
Vallam Narasimha Rao as Gopalam
A. V. Subba Rao Jr. as District Collector
C. Hemalatha Devi as Venu's mother
Ammaji as  Bharathi
Waheeda Rehman as a dancer in the song "Eruvaaka Sagaroranno Chinnanna"

Production 
Sixteen years after making Raithu Bidda (1939), a film which dealt with the hardships faced by poor peasants under the zamindari rule, the production house Sarathi Films decided to make another film dealing with similar issues, titled Rojulu Marayi. The producer of the film was C. V. R. Prasad, who also wrote the screenplay with Kondepudi Lakshminarayana and Tapi Chanakya, who was named director. The cinematography was handled by Kamal Ghosh, and editing by Tilak and Akkineni Sanjeevi. Filming took place prominently at the Dandimitta village.

When shooting for the film was almost complete, Prasad felt that a celebration song set after the film's harvest scene would add colour to the black-and-white film. Lyricist Kosaraju remembered a song he had written for producer Thottempudi Ramayya's shelved film Paleru, that was composed by Venu. Chanakya and Prasad liked the lyrics and the tune, and Vedantam Jagannatha Sarma suggested Waheeda Rehman, then a dancer, to the makers.

Soundtrack 
The soundtrack was composed by Master Venu. "Eruvaaka Sagaroranno Chinnanna" was inspired by the folk song "Ayyo Koyyoda", popularised by Valluri Jagannatha Rao. It was later adapted into many other songs, such as "Summa Kidantha Sothuku Nashtam" in the Tamil film Madurai Veeran (1956) and "Dekhne Me Bhola Hai Mera Salona" in the Hindi film Bombai Ka Babu (1960).

Release and reception 
Rojulu Marayi was released on 14 April 1955. The film ran for over 25 weeks in theatres, thereby becoming a silver jubilee film. Its 100th day functions were held in the Hyderabad-based Rajeswar theatre and K. V. Ranga Reddy, then the Deputy Chief Minister of Andhra Pradesh, presided over the function. The film was later remade in Tamil as Kaalam Maari Pochi (1956), where "Eruvaaka Sagaroranno Chinnanna" was re-used as "Yerupooti Povaye Anne Sinnanne", with Waheeda Rehman returning as dancer.

References

Bibliography

External links 
 

1950s Telugu-language films
1955 films
Films directed by Tapi Chanakya
Indian drama films
Telugu films remade in other languages
1955 drama films
Indian black-and-white films
Films scored by Master Venu